Ivo Karlović was the defending champion but decided not to participate.
James Blake won the title, defeating Mischa Zverev 6–1, 1–6, 6–4 in the final.

Seeds

Draw

Finals

Top half

Bottom half

References
 Main Draw
 Qualifying Draw

Natomas Men's Professional Tennis Tournament - Singles
2012 Singles